The 1999 European Parliament election in Portugal was the election of MEP representing Portugal constituency for the 1999–2004 term of the European Parliament. It was part of the wider 1999 European election. In Portugal the election was held on 13 June.

In the runner up for the 1999 general elections, the Socialist Party (PS) won the EU elections by a landslide. The party, headed by its founder and former PR and PM Mário Soares, scored a convincing victory over the Social Democrats. The PS increased its share of vote more than 8% and won 2 more seats compared with 1994. The Social Democratic Party (PSD) had a bad performance, but was able to hold on to its 9 seats, but, at the same time, the party saw their share of vote drop to 31%, around 3% lower than in 1994.

The Democratic Unity Coalition (CDU) performed quite well, although it dropped compared with 1994. The Communist/Green alliance won more than 10% of the votes, a drop of around 1%, and lost one seat but was able to reclaim the title of 3rd largest party. The People's Party (CDS–PP), was the party that suffered the most. The People's Party dropped to fourth place and had the biggest fall in terms of share of the vote, winning just 8% of the vote, a fall of more than 4%. They also lost one seat compared to 1994.

Turnout increased compared with 1994, with 39.9% of voters casting a ballot.

Electoral system
The voting method used, for the election of European members of parliament, is by proportional representation using the d'Hondt method, which is known to benefit leading parties. In the 1999 EU elections, Portugal had 25 seats to be filled. Deputies are elected in a single constituency, corresponding to the entire national territory.

Parties and candidates
The major parties that partook in the election, and their EP list leaders, were:

Left Bloc (BE), Miguel Portas
Democratic Unity Coalition (CDU), Ilda Figueiredo
Socialist Party (PS), Mário Soares
Social Democratic Party (PSD), José Pacheco Pereira
People's Party (CDS–PP), Paulo Portas

National summary of votes and seats

|-
! style="background-color:#E9E9E9;text-align:left;" colspan=2 |National party
! style="background-color:#E9E9E9;text-align:left;" |Europeanparty
! style="background-color:#E9E9E9;text-align:left;" |Main candidate
! style="background-color:#E9E9E9;text-align:right;" |Votes
! style="background-color:#E9E9E9;text-align:right;" |%
! style="background-color:#E9E9E9;text-align:right;" |+/–
! style="background-color:#E9E9E9;text-align:right;" |Seats
! style="background-color:#E9E9E9;text-align:right;" |+/–
|- style="text-align:right;"
| style="background-color: " width=5px|
| style="text-align:left;" | Socialist Party (PS)
| style="text-align:left;" | PES
| style="text-align:left;" | Mário Soares
| 1,493,146
| 43.07
| 8.20 
! 12
| 2 
|- style="text-align:right;"
| style="background-color: " width=5px|
| style="text-align:left;" | Social Democratic Party (PSD)
| style="text-align:left;" | EPP
| style="text-align:left;" | José Pacheco Pereira
| 1,078,528
| 31.11	
| 3.28 
! 9
| 0 
|- style="text-align:right;"
| style="background-color: " width=5px|
| style="text-align:left;vertical-align:top;" | Democratic Unitarian Coalition (CDU) • Communist Party (PCP)• Ecologist Party (PEV)
| style="text-align:left;vertical-align:top;" | GUE/NGL
| style="text-align:left;vertical-align:top;" | Ilda Figueiredo
| style="vertical-align:top;" | 357,671
| style="vertical-align:top;" | 10.32
| style="vertical-align:top;" | 0.87 
! 220
| 1 0 
|- style="text-align:right;"
| style="background-color: " width=5px|
| style="text-align:left;" | People's Party (CDS–PP)
| style="text-align:left;" | UFE
| style="text-align:left;" | Paulo Portas
| 283,067
| 8.16	
| 4.29 
! 2
| 1 
|- style="text-align:right;"
| style="background-color: " width=5px|
| style="text-align:left;" | Left Bloc (BE)
| style="text-align:left;" | None
| style="text-align:left;" | Miguel Portas
| 61,920
| 1.79	
| new
! 0
| new
|- align="right"
| style="background-color: " width=5px|
| style="text-align:left;" | Workers' Communist Party (PCTP/MRPP)
| style="text-align:left;" | None
| style="text-align:left;" | António Garcia Pereira
| 30,446
| 0.88
| 0.09 
! 0
| 0 
|- align="right"
| style="background-color: " width=5px|
| align="left"| People's Monarchist Party (PPM)
| align="left"| None
| align="left"| -
| 16,182
| 0.45
| 0.20 
! 0
| 0 
|- style="text-align:right;"
| style="background-color: " width=5px|
| align="left"| Earth Party (MPT)
| align="left"| ELDR
| align="left"| Paulo Trancoso
| 13,924
| 0.40
| 0.03 
! 0
| 0 
|- align="right"
| style="background-color:#000080" width=5px|
| align="left"| National Solidarity Party (PSN)
| align="left"| None 
| align="left"| -
| 8,413
| 0.24
| 0.13 
! 0
| 0 
|- align="right"
| style="background-color: " width=5px|
| align="left"| Workers Party of Socialist Unity (POUS)
| align="left"| None
| align="left"| Carmelinda Pereira
| 5,565
| 0.16
| 0.06 
! 0
| 0 
|- align="right"
| style="background-color: " width=5px|
| align="left"| Democratic Party of the Atlantic (PDA)
| align="left"| None
| align="left"| -
| 5,089
| 0.15
| 0.08 
! 0
| 0 
|- align="right"
|- style="background-color:#E9E9E9"
| style="text-align:right;" colspan="4" | Valid votes
| 3,353,951
| 96.74
| colspan="3" rowspan="2" | 
|- style="background-color:#E9E9E9"
| style="text-align:right;" colspan="4" | Blank and invalid votes
| 113,134
| 3.26
|- style="background-color:#E9E9E9"
| style="text-align:right;" colspan="4" | Totals
| 3,467,085
| 100.00
| —
! style="background-color:#E9E9E9"|25
| 0 
|- style="background-color:#E9E9E9"
| colspan="4" | Electorate (eligible voters) and voter turnout
| 8,681,854
| 39.93
| 4.39 
| colspan="2"| 
|-
| style="text-align:left;" colspan="11" | Source: Comissão Nacional de Eleições 
|}

Distribution by European group

Maps

References

See also

Politics of Portugal
List of political parties in Portugal
Elections in Portugal
European Parliament

Portugal
European Parliament elections in Portugal
1999 elections in Portugal